In finance, a Class B share or Class C share is a designation for a share class of a common or preferred stock that typically has strengthened voting rights or other benefits compared to a Class A share that may have been created. The equity structure, or how many types of shares are offered, is determined by the corporate charter.

B share can also refer to various terms relating to stock classes:

 B share (mainland China), a class of stock on the Shanghai and Shenzhen stock exchanges
 B share (NYSE), a class of stock on the New York Stock Exchange

Most of the time, Class B shares may have lower repayment priorities in the event a company declares bankruptcy. Each company’s classes of stock differs and more information is often included in the company’s prospectus. If held long term, Class B shares may also be converted to Class A shares. There are also different reasons for creating Class B shares within a company—there are, however, similar arrangements which companies seem to use when it comes to equity structure.

Class B common shares can be invested in through mutual funds, or through the public market (stock exchange). There are also Class B shares which are referred to as preferred shares in certain companies. Before investing in the shares, investors will look at different financial ratios which will help them value the share and aid in the decision of investing in the stock.

Definition and Application

A share is defined as an ownership of equity in a corporation. Class B shares are known as a type of classification of common stock which may have more or fewer voting rights as compared to Class A shares. In the event of bankruptcy, Class B shares may have a lower repayment priority as well.

Class B shares are financial instruments which represent ownership in a company and proportionate claims on its assets. They exist in companies with dual-class structures or with multiple classes of stock with differences in their voting rights attached to each class. The creation of multiple classes are designed to allow founders of the company to maintain ownership over their company as well as to control the company’s direction. Additionally, having different share classes can be a way for companies to reward early investors: For example, certain companies may designate Class B shareholders as those who invested with the company before a certain period, thus the investors may enjoy benefits such as higher dividends compared to those in other share classes. These details will be illustrated clearly in the company’s bylaws

Like shares in other share classes, investors can invest in Class B shares through the stock market. Stock markets are secondary markets where current shareholders can transact with potential investors. Another way to invest in Class B shares is through regulated over-the-counter (OTC) exchanges. However, the shares listed there tend to be riskier because they tend to list companies which have failed to meet to more stringent listing criteria of larger exchanges. Additionally, stocks traded OTC usually belong to smaller companies which do not have the resources to be listed on formal exchanges.

The price of the Class B shares fluctuates perpetually as investors reassess the intrinsic value of shares. The decision investors makes as to whether to buy, sell, or hold the stock is based on whether they believe that the stock is undervalued, overvalued, or valued correctly. The price at which someone wishes to buy any share, be it Class B or other classes, is called a bid price.  On the other hand, the price at which someone wishes to sell, is known as an ask price or offer.  For popular stocks, buyers and sellers will be on each side bidding and asking for new prices consistently. The price of the bid will go up if the demand is more than the supply. On the contrary, if the supply is more than the demand, the bid price will go down.

History of Class B Shares

Berkshire Hathaway

Berkshire Hathaway was the first company to introduce 517,500 new Class B shares into the market in 1996. The company demonstrated the differences between Class A and B shares clearly—stating that the Class B common stock has the economic interests equivalent to 1/30th of a Class A common stock,  but has only 1/200th of the voting rights of a Class A common stock. This meant that each share of Class A stock could initially be converted to 30 shares of Class B stock at the option of the holder.

Warren Buffett, the CEO of Berkshire Hathaway, said at the 1996 annual meeting that the intended purpose of Class B shares was made to match the demand for those shares, and was aimed to prevent false inducements. Additionally, unequal voting shares are created so that owners of the company do not have to give up control, but can still tap into the public equity market for financing. Furthermore, the price of the new Class B shares attracted many small investors, whilst making Berkshire accessible to the people with modest amounts of capital. Additionally, his intention was to market Class B shares as a type of long-term investment to prevent prices from fluctuating from supply concerns. Mr Buffett also refused to a stock split and claimed that the high price of Class A shares created an intentional barrier to entry. He added that the company wishes to attract investment-oriented shareholders with long-term horizons.

Ever since, many companies, such as Meta, Groupon, and Alibaba, have incorporated the dual-class stock structure to ensure owners have control over their company while still being able to reach out to many more potential investors at more attractive share prices.

Valuation Metrics of Class B Shares
There are a few things to take into account before analysts value the Class B shares of a company. Valuation of the shares must account for all of its economic rights. These rights include: liquidations preference, dividend rights, conversion rights, redemption rights, participation rights as well as anti-dilution rights.  
Like other shares, the intrinsic value of a Class B share helps investors decide if they want to buy a stock. Intrinsic value refers to the fundamental and objective value in the asset. This value is different from the market value of a Class B share, if the market price is below the intrinsic value, it may be a good buy. Otherwise, it may be a good sale.

Before investing in Class B shares, investors may value the shares using different metrics to find out which stocks the market has undervalued. Financial ratios are used to analyse a company’s fundamentals. Here are some popular financial metrics used by investors to determine the value of a stock.

Price-to-Earnings Ratio (P/E Ratio)

This is the most common way to value a stock. It is represented by the stock price divided by the company’s most recent earnings per share (EPS). The lower the P/E ratio, the more attractive the amount of value for the share.

This is because a high P/E ratio indicates that a stock’s price is expensive whereas a low P/E ratio indicates that the stock price is cheaper compared to its earnings. This ratio is important as it helps determine whether a stock is overvalued or |undervalued.

Price-to-Book Ratio (P/B Ratio) 

The P/B ratio is calculated using a company’s current market value divided by its book value. The balance sheet of the company will inform decision-makers on the company’s book value.
This ratio shows investors the difference between the Class B’s market value and the book value of the stock. 
Similar to the P/E ratio, a P/B ratio is generally better if it is lower. A P/B ratio of 0.95, 1 or 1.1 shows that the stock is being traded at what its worth. Hence, investors are more drawn to lower P/B values as it implies that the Class B share is undervalued.

Debt-to-Equity Ratio (D/E Ratio)

The D/E ratio is a leverage ratio which determines how much debt a company uses to finance its assets. It evaluates the company’s financial leverage by dividing total liabilities by shareholder equity. This ratio is used in corporate finance as it measures the degree the company is financing its operations through debt or their own funding. It also gives insight on the ability of shareholder equity to cover outstanding debt in case the business fails.

A higher risk is often associated with a high D/E ratio. This is because it shows that the company has an aggressive approach when it comes to financing its growth with debt. Additionally, when the D/E ratio gets too high, the cost of borrowing is dramatically increased which may eventually drive down the Class B’s share price of the firm. However, it may also be good as it shows that a firm can easily repay its debt obligations and is using leverage to increase the amount of equity returns.

Differences Between Class A and Class B Shares

General Investments

Different companies have detailed descriptions of their different classes of stock written in their prospectus, bylaws, and charter. When there are a few classes of stock in a company, they are usually designated as Class A and Class B – where Class A shares carry more voting rights than Class B shares. The percentage difference in voting rights depends on how the company wishes to structure its stock. However, companies are not legally obliged to structure their classes this way – there are some companies which offer more voting rights for their Class B shares instead.

Class B shares are also usually lower in payment priority as compared to Class A shares. When a company goes bankrupt and is forced to be liquidated, Class A shareholders are likely to be paid faster than Class B shareholders. Class A shareholders also usually have dividend priority, which means that companies distribute dividends to Class A shareholders first.

Technology Arrangement

The technology class arrangement derived its name from its popularity amongst technology companies. It usually involves insiders of a company having control over their Class B shares. The Class B shares have about 10 times the voting power of Class A shares, and are not traded on public exchanges. These shares are called "super-voting shares" as they give key company insiders larger control over the company which includes its board and is usually the deciding factor for corporate actions. Hence, he "super-voting shares" are usually not publicly traded. One popular example would be the” Google Share Class Structure”. The purpose of this structure is argued to ensure stability of the company and prevent the board and management from feeling short-term pressure, which in turn allows them to focus on long-term goals.

High-Priced Arrangement

Some companies value their Class A shares at extremely high prices. Although these Class A shares are publicly owned and traded on the market, they are generally out of reach for the typical investor. In these cases, firms create Class B shares which trade at a mere fraction of the Class A’s share. The Class B share, however, has only a small fraction of voting power. These companies create both share classes in a way where price and voting power are not proportional. One example of this arrangement is the Berkshire Hathaway structure.

Mutual Funds

In mutual funds, there are a few differences which set the share classes apart. In terms of fees, Class A share funds charge a “front load”, meaning that a percentage of the purchase amount has to be paid each time shares are bought as commission for the mutual fund’s managers.
These front loads can go up to 5% or even higher. On the other hand, Class B share funds charge a “back-end load”, also known as a “contingent deferred sales charge” (CSDC). This means that when the investor chooses to sell, a percentage of the dollar value of shares sold has to be paid. This back-end load, however, decreases directly proportional to the holding period of the fund,  and is eventually eliminated.  Class B shares can also automatically be converted to Class A shares after a specific holding period, which is beneficial because Class A shares have a lower yearly expense ratio.

Class B mutual fund shares are seen to be a good investment if investors have less cash and a longer time horizon. To avoid the exit fee, an investor should typically remain in the fund for five to eight years.

Why Companies Create Class B Shares

Companies choose to create Class B shares and dual-class structures to allow founders, and other corporate insiders gain almost complete voting control over the company. This is crucial in the early years of a public company because founders are able to execute their own vision without disruption while being able to tap into the public market’s financing, and being able to enjoy the perks of being a public company. 
Companies choose to mitigate the risk of exposing their governance and assets to the public market by defining different classes of shares to ensure corporate insiders are in control of the voting rights. With Class B shares in a company, authorities are able to assign different rights to different classes of stockholders. They use different classifications to address issues such as voting authority, dividends, as well as rights to capital and assets.

Meta
An example is the company Meta, formerly known as Facebook. Mark Zuckerberg, the CEO of Meta, owns 360 million Class B shares which gives him complete voting power over other shareholders. Additionally, through agreements with other Class B shareholders, he also controls the votes of 32 other million Class B shares. This gives him control of about 392 million Class B shares, amounting to a total of around 90% of Class B shares available. This amounts to 58% of Meta's vote in total. The ownership of majority of the shares has allowed Zuckerberg to act independently in his decision. One example is his decision to purchase Instagram for US$1 billion, which was made without consulting other Class B shareholders. The company's board has also rejected proposals which aim to weaken Zuckerberg's grip on the company which includes removing the Class B shares in Meta.

Alibaba Group
Another reason for having the founders maintain absolute control of their company is that founders are able to focus on the long-term strategic development of their company. The Executive Chairman of Alibaba Group, Jack Ma, has added that his company’s voting structure aims to preserve the firm’s culture whilst avoiding short-term behaviour at the expense of long-term development. The company is  controlled by 28 "partners", including insiders and Ma himself. With this structure, Ma's dictatorship blocks the possibility of any contested election. This means that shareholders will not be able to have a say no matter how the equity ownership evolves in the future.

Google LLC
Google had similar intentions in releasing their Class B shares to make it harder for the public to influence the company’s strategic decisions through their voting rights. Their company’s Class A stock has one vote per share. On the other hand, Google's Class B stock, which is owned and split amongst CEO Eric Schmidt and founders Larry Page and Sergey Brin, was created to have 10 votes per share. Although the three of them only own 31.3% of the total outstanding shares and 86 million Class B shares, because of the voting ratio, the trio controls 66.2% of Google's voting power.  Google’s CEO said that the purpose of creating Class B shares was to make it easier for management to follow a “long-term, innovation-based growth strategy”.

Conversion of Share Classes

Shareholders may be able to convert their Class A shares into Class B shares or vice versa depending on what is stated in their bylaws and charter. Fees will also be collected by the company which helps draft legal documents for the conversion of shares in addition to other services in the process such as reviewing, drafting and also updating articles.

Reasons for changing share classes include: 
 Opportunities to change the management of the company
 Dividend allocation and capital distribution
 Alteration of voting rights

In order to change share classes, members of the company must pass an ordinary resolution with the following details:
 Name of shareholder
 Number of shares changed
 Previous class of shares
 New class of shares

Shareholders with Class A shares registered under the name of another nominee must contact the nominee to request a conversion.

After approving the resolution, the company will have to submit a form to the regulatory authority in the country, where the process is given full validation. Later on, new share certificates will be issued to the shareholders who have converted their shares. The application is also normally binding and cannot be revoked.

Shares of Class B Preferred Stock 

Some companies may refer to their Class B shares as preferred stock. These stocks are described as a hybrid between bonds and common stock as it has features of both securities. These dividends which come with these shares are paid to shareholders before common shareholders when a company goes bankrupt.    Preferred stockholders tend to have a higher claim on asset distributions or dividends compared to common stockholders. This is because of the higher risk assumed with the shares.  More information on the preferred stock are dependent on the company and written in the company’s bylaws and charter.  
Preferred Class B shares generate income which gets preferential tax treatment, and most companies do not give preferred shareholders voting rights. These shares may also be convertible to a predetermined number of common stock, depending on the company’s bylaws. Shareholders’ dividends from these stocks usually yield more than common stock and are paid monthly or quarterly.

When preferred shares are issued, issuers avoid dilution of control as there are limited or no voting rights which come with the shares. Companies can also buy back the preferred stock and if the price is above the par value, investors may receive a profit from the stock.

See also
 H share
 Red chip
 P chip
 S chip
 N share
 L share
 G share
 China Concepts Stock

References

Equity securities